Beverly Ann Hannon (née Hahesy) (born Manchester, Iowa, March 30, 1932) served two terms as state senator for Iowa.  Hannon was chair of the Human Resources Committee and helped found the Democratic Activist Women's Network.

She was inducted into the Iowa Democratic Party's Hall of Fame in 2015.

Bills introduced by Senator Hannon include:
 The "Potty Parity Bill"
 Iowa's Anti-stalking Law

References

1932 births
Living people
People from Delaware County, Iowa
Democratic Party Iowa state senators
University of Iowa alumni
Women state legislators in Iowa
20th-century American politicians
20th-century American women politicians
21st-century American women